The 2006 Damallsvenskan was the 19th season of the Damallsvenskan. Matches were played between 17 April and 29 October 2006. Umeå IK won the league, defending their title from the previous year. It was Umeå's fourth title overall. Djurgården/Älvsjö finished second, 21 points behind. This is the biggest gap between first and second place in Damalsvenskan's history.  Linköpings FC finished third. 

The previous season, Bälinge IF and Jitex BK were promoted. Jitex were relegated again, together with Mallbackens IF.

Winners are marked in green, and relegated teams in pink. (N) marks newly promoted teams, and (M) marks the defending champions.

References

External links
Details at Soccerway

Damallsvenskan
2006 in association football
2006 in Swedish sport